Diego Ramirez de Cepeda (died 1629) was a Roman Catholic prelate who served as Bishop of Cartagena in Colombia (1624–1629).

Biography
Diego Ramirez de Cepeda was born in Lima, Peru. On 15 July 1624, he was appointed during the papacy of Pope Urban VIII as Bishop of Cartagena in Colombia.
He served as Bishop of Cartagena in Colombia until his death in 1629.

References

External links and additional sources
 (for Chronology of Bishops) 
 (for Chronology of Bishops) 

17th-century Roman Catholic bishops in New Granada
Bishops appointed by Pope Urban VIII
Roman Catholic bishops of Cartagena in Colombia
1629 deaths
Clergy from Lima